Hamme is a part of the city of Bochum in the Ruhr area in North Rhine-Westphalia, Germany. Up to the 19th century Westphalian was spoken here. Bochum-Hamme is a district in the working-class north of Bochum. So it is the part of Bochum with the highest number of poor families. Bochum-Hamme includes Goldhamme, the south of which borders onto the former town of Wattenscheid. Hamme houses a large Turkish minority. Some parts of Hamme, especially the so-called Speckschweiz quarter, currently experiences some gentrification attracting young middle-class families, students and artists.

Hamm